Home Improvements is the sixth studio album by Melbourne band My Friend the Chocolate Cake. The album was released in 2007.

Track listing
(All lyrics by David Bridie, song arrangements by My Friend the Chocolate Cake)
"Hymn for the Carnies" – 5:14
"Home Improvements" – 3:42
"She Dreams All Different Colours" – 4:07
"Five Sisters" – 5:42
"The Weather Coast" (music by Dean Addison, Bridie, Greg Patten) – 5:59
"Pentecostal Girl" – 4:15
"Opus Lagavulin" (music by Hope Csutoros, Helen Mountfort) – 4:20
"Let's Go Walk This Town" – 4:11
"Seek" – 4:40
"The Forgotten Athletes of Persia" (music by Csutoros, Mountfort) – 3:53
"John Patap" (music by Junior Devils Stringband, Bridie) – 2:46
"Movement" (music by Mountfort, Addison) – 4:48
"This Life Tonight" – 6:29
"Malaise" – 4:44

Personnel
David Bridie – piano, singing, harmonium
Helen Mountfort – cello, backing vocals
Hope Csutoros – violin
Andrew Carswell – mandolin, tin whistle
Greg Patten – drums, ukulele, bvs
Dean Addison – double bass
Andrew Richardson – acoustic guitar

Charts

References

External links
My Friend the Chocolate Cake, Sydney Morning Herald

My Friend the Chocolate Cake albums
2007 albums